Qazipora (also known as Gurdaspur) was initially a autonomous village in Bandipora district, Jammu and Kashmir, India. Later on it was merged with Patushay, and formed a new Village called Qazipora Patushi. It is just 4 km away from Bandipora town, and 59 km away from Srinagar.

Transport

Road 
Qazipora is connected by road with other places in Jammu and Kashmir and India by the Srinagar-Bandipora Road, Sopore-Bandipora Road, etc.

Rail 
The nearest railway stations to Qazipora are Sopore Railway Station and Srinagar Railway Station, located at a distance of 27 and 71 kilometres from Qazipora respectively.

Air 
The nearest airport is Srinagar International Airport located at a distance of 67 km from Qazipora.

Culture 
See: Culture of Kashmir

See also 

 Patushay
 Bandipora
 Gurez Valley
 Wullar Lake
 Qazipora Patushi
 Harmukh
 Kashmir

References 

Villages in Bandipora district
Bandipora district